"I Can't Wait" is a contemporary rock song written by Brooke McClymont, Christopher Ward and Matthew Gerrard. McClymont recorded the song as her debut single; it was released in Australia on 17 June 2002 as a CD single and peaked at number forty-nine on the Australian ARIA Singles Chart. McClymont chose the song to be her debut single because she felt it is a really positive song and shows her personality.

Music video
The video was directed by Sam Rebillet. It opens with McClymont walking down the street holding a guitar, and she goes inside a building and walks up the stairs. She then sits on a windowsill playing the guitar. When McClymont is singing with the guitar a girl with black hair and pigtails, played by McClymont, walks in a crowded hall and people crash into her. The girl looks at her phone and into the distance. During the first chorus McClymont is playing the guitar with her band. At the second verse the girl crashes into a man with a red shirt on and brown hair, who then follows her. When the second chorus begins McClymont plays the guitar, and the girl sits down on a chair in a train station. The train turns up and the man gets on. When the doors start closing the girl throws the man her phone and then makes hand movements saying "I'll call you". The video was played a few times on the Australian music shows Video Hits and rage.

Charts

Hilary Duff version

Hilary Duff recorded a cover version of "I Can't Wait" in 2002 for the soundtrack to the Disney Channel series Lizzie McGuire, in which she starred. It was released to mainstream pop radio stations on August 12, 2002.

Chart performance
The single received extremely little mainstream radio play, but it had reached number one on Radio Disney in the United States by November 2002, with one station playing the song 850 times over a six-week period. The Los Angeles Times reported that music industry critics attributed the success of the single to Buena Vista Records's status as a sister company to Radio Disney, which had an affiliation with Disney Channel. This was believed to be in violation of the Federal Communications Commission's broadcasting rules, which prohibit corporations from using broadcast licenses "for their own benefit or to gain a competitive advantage in any transaction." Media expert Robert McChesney, from the University of Illinois, said it "clearly violates the spirit – if not the letter – of the law. It undermines the integrity of the public airwaves, corroding editorial space with commercial factors. It's very damaging."

The Radio Disney head of programming, Robin Jones, said "I Can't Wait" had gone to number one because of requests from listeners and that the radio chain does not deliberately favor acts associated with Disney. Duff herself called the Los Angeles Times article "really mean ... It's funny that you pick on a kid my age because I'm on the Disney Channel, sorry!"

Music video
Its music video features clips from the show alongside shots of Duff dancing, holding a guitar and singing with soap bubbles and confetti floating around her, and she also performs the song in a mock studio setting. A remix of the song is featured on the "Why Not" (2003) CD single. A music video was also released for the remix.

Chieko Kawabe version
In 2005, the song was rewritten in Japanese and performed by Chieko Kawabe on her album Brilliance. It was for the Japanese version of Lizzie McGuire.

Notes

External links
 
 

2002 debut singles
Hilary Duff songs
Songs written by Matthew Gerrard
Songs written by Christopher Ward (songwriter)
Songs written by Brooke McClymont
Lizzie McGuire
Walt Disney Records singles
2002 songs